The 2013 FIRS Roller Hockey World Cup U-20 was the 6th edition of the FIRS Roller Hockey World Cup U-20. It was held in October 2013 in Cartagena, Colombia. Portugal won its second title.

Venues
Medellin, Colombia was the host city of the tournament.

Group stage

Group A

Group B

Group C

Group D

Knockout stage

Championship

Games
Quarter-Final

Semi-Finals

Final

5th-8th place

9th-16th place

13th-14th place

15th-17th Place

Final standing

References

External links
CIRH website
Official website of the Championship

FIRS Roller Hockey World Cup U-20
R
2013 FIRS World Cup U-20
2013 FIRS U-20 World Cup